The Go-Ahead Group plc is a passenger transport company based in Newcastle upon Tyne, England, with operations in the United Kingdom, Ireland, Singapore, Norway and Germany. Formerly listed on the London Stock Exchange, in 2022 it was purchased by Kinetic Group and Globalvia.

History

Incorporation
The Go-Ahead Group was originally founded as Go-Ahead Northern Limited on 17 February 1987 as a consequence of the privatisation of the National Bus Company, during which a partial management buyout led by Martin Ballinger and Chris Moyes purchased its Gateshead-based northern division, known as the Northern General Transport Company. Early expansion of the company involved the acquisition of several smaller competing bus operators in North East England, such as Gypsy Queen in 1989 and Low Fell Coaches in June 1992. Go-Ahead Northern also became a subcontractor to National Express, operating services to the Midlands, North East, North West and South West England. Around the same time, Go-Ahead Leisure purchased a number of pubs, which were sold on during February 1996.

Despite bidding for a number of other larger bus operators in the intervening period, Go-Ahead's first major acquisition was Brighton & Hove in November 1993, followed by the Oxford Bus Company and Wycombe Bus Company in March 1994. In May 1997, the Brighton & Hove operation expanded with the acquisition of the former municipal operator Brighton Transport. During September 1999, Metrobus, a large operator operating in London, Surrey and Sussex was acquired.

Flotation and into London
Initially, it was structured as an unlisted public company owned 90 percent by its management. However, in May 1994, Go-Ahead was floated on the London Stock Exchange. In October 1994, Go-Ahead purchased London Central during the privatisation of London Buses.

During March 1995, OK Motor Services was purchased and integrated into the Go North East operation. In June 1996, a second London bus operation, London General, was acquired from the management team that had purchased it when privatised.

Airport services
In October 1998, Go-Ahead diversified into Airport Services with the acquisition of Gatwick Handling International, a provider of ground handling services at UK airports. Go-Ahead acquired the ground handling operations of British Midland and Midland Airport Services in March 2001 followed by Reed Aviation in August 2001. Along with Go-Ahead's existing Gatwick Handling International operation, all were rebranded as Aviance.

In May 2002, Go-Ahead diversified again, acquiring airport-focused Meteor Parking. Included in the purchase of Gatwick Handling International in 1998 was a 50% shareholding in Plane Handling. In August 2004 Go-Ahead purchased the remaining 50% from Virgin Aviation.  In December 2006 Gatwick Airport parking operator PAS was purchased and integrated into Meteor Parking, followed by security provider Nikaro in February 2007.

In January 2010, Go-Ahead disposed of most of its airport-based operations via a sale to Dnata UK and Servisair.  In September 2010, Meteor Parking was sold to Vinci SA, bringing Go-Ahead's involvement in the aviation support industry to a close.

1996 – 2010

Rail business 
In October 1996, Go-Ahead entered the UK rail market when it commenced operating the Thames Trains franchise which it ran until March 2004. The Thames Trains franchise was awarded by the Director of Passenger Rail Franchising to Victory Rail Holdings. Go-Ahead owned 65% of the shares in Victory Rail Holdings with the remaining 35% held by some ex British Rail managers and employees. Go-Ahead bought the remaining shares it did not own in June 1998. Go-Ahead entered into a joint venture with VIA-GTI, taking a 65% stake in Govia. Govia ran the Thameslink franchise from March 1997 until March 2006.

In August 2001, Govia started running the South Central rail franchise. In October 2000 the Shadow Strategic Rail Authority awarded Govia the South Central rail franchise with operations due to commence in May 2003 when the Connex South Central franchise expired. Govia negotiated a deal with Connex to buy out the remainder of its franchise.

Failed takeover and operations in Sweden
In 2000, French government owned C3D made an unsuccessful takeover bid for the company. In 2000, Go-Ahead entered two joint ventures with VIA-GTI and BK Tåg to operate rail services in Sweden. Go-Ahead had a 39% stake in City Pendeln AB which was to operate the Citypendeln commuter rail business in Stockholm. Go-Ahead had a 29% stake in Sydvasten AB which operated rail services between Gothenburg and Malmö. Due to problems, Go-Ahead exited both ventures.

Wycombe Bus Company was sold to Arriva in December 2000.

Expansion into the Midlands and the South 
In August 2003, the Wilts & Dorset bus business was purchased. In June 2005 Solent Blue Line and Southern Vectis were purchased. In September 2005 the Lewes and Seaford operations of Stagecoach South were acquired and integrated into the Brighton & Hove business.

In December 2005, Go-Ahead purchased The Birmingham Coach Company, which operated express coaches under contract for National Express and local bus services in the West Midlands under the Diamond Bus name. Go-Ahead had been known for some time to be keen to begin operating in the area. In February 2006 another operator in the West Midlands, Probus Management, trading as People's Express, was purchased.

In August 2006, the Birmingham Coach Company (trading as Diamond Bus) and Probus operations were regrouped under the Go West Midlands Limited legal entity, with the bus operations branded as Diamond in the West Midlands. In February 2006 the Hants & Dorset Trim bus refurbishment business was purchased. In April 2006 the Govia joint venture commenced operating the South Eastern franchise as Southeastern.

In September 2006, Docklands Buses was acquired and integrated into Go-Ahead London, followed in October 2006 by Marchwood Motorways which was integrated into Go South Coast.

In June 2007, Blue Triangle was acquired and integrated into Go-Ahead London. In September 2007 Northumbria Coaches was purchased and integrated into Go North East, followed by Stanley Buses (the bus service subsidiary of Stanley Taxis) in October 2007, and Redby Buses in January 2008. In November 2007 Govia began operating the London Midland rail franchise. In December 2007 the Orpington services of First London were acquired.

In February 2008, Go-Ahead sold Go West Midlands to Rotala's Central Connect, two years after purchasing the company. In June 2008 the Gatwick Express rail service was incorporated into Southern. In October 2009 East Thames Buses was acquired and integrated into Go-Ahead London as well as the Horsham operations of Arriva Southern Counties that were integrated into Metrobus. In December 2009 Plymouth Citybus was purchased from Plymouth City Council. In March 2010 Konectbus in Norfolk was purchased as well as the Hexham operations of Arriva North East and integrated into Go North East.

American operations
In August 2010, Go-Ahead America, a joint venture with Cook Illinois in which Go-Ahead held a 50% stake, commenced operating a yellow school bus contract in St Louis, Missouri. In July 2014, Go-Ahead exited the United States following the loss of its yellow bus contract.

Since 2011

Acquisitions
In May 2011, Go-Ahead acquired Thames Travel in South Oxfordshire. Acquisitions in 2012 were Carousel Buses (March) integrated into Oxford Bus Company, Essex-based Hedingham (March), the Northumberland Park-based operations of First London (March), Anglian Bus (April) in Norfolk and Suffolk, and HC Chambers & Son, Suffolk (June) (immediately operationally merged with Hedingham).

In September 2014, Govia Thameslink Railway commenced operating the Thameslink, Southern & Great Northern franchise.

Expansion into Europe and Singapore
In November 2015, Go-Ahead Singapore was awarded a contract to operate 25 bus services in Singapore previously operated by SBS Transit out of Loyang Bus Depot, which commenced on 4 September 2016. In the same month, Go-Ahead Germany were awarded two rail contracts in Stuttgart, Germany. The contracts commenced in 20192020.

In August 2017, Go-Ahead won a tender to run 24 routes previously operated by Dublin Bus. Go-Ahead Ireland commenced the contract with the National Transport Authority to operate these routes on 9 September 2018. In June 2018 East Yorkshire Motor Services was purchased with over 300 buses. In January 2019, Go-Ahead Ireland commenced operating a further six routes between Dublin and its outlying commuter towns, previously operated by Bus Éireann.

In October 2018, Go-Ahead won a tender to run the Oslo south package, consisting of three routes previously operated by NSB. Go-Ahead Norge commenced the contract with the Norwegian Railway Directorate to operate these routes in December 2019.

Manchester and Cornwall
In February 2019, Go-Ahead announced it would buy First Greater Manchester's Cheetham Hill depot with 163 buses and brand it Go North West.

In March 2020, Go Cornwall Bus partnered with Cornwall Council and local operators to form a new Transport for Cornwall brand, with plans calling for an additional 130 vehicles.

Termination of Southeastern rail franchise 
On 28 September 2021, the Department for Transport announced it would terminate the Southeastern franchise the following month, after the discovery of financial misconduct. Southeastern had not declared over £25million that should have been repaid to the government in the period since 2014. Go-Ahead's Chief Financial Officer resigned.

On 9 December 2021, the company announced that its auditors needed more time to consider the implications of the misconduct and potential fines from the Department for Transport (DfT). Consequently, the annual results would not be ready at the end of the company's financial year on 2 January 2022, which would oblige the company to request suspension of trading in its shares. The share price fell by about 15% on the day of the announcement.

On 24 February 2022, Go-Ahead published their delayed 202021 results, and announced the outcome of investigations into the termination of the franchise. The review found that "serious errors had been made” since 2006, with the expected cost to the company to be over £80million. The amount owed to the DfT was increased to £51.3million, with errors dating back to 2006. Go-Ahead also stated that they expect to have to pay a fine to the DfT, setting aside up to £30million for this. Go-Ahead also stated that they may also owe DfT an additional £21.3million, related to a dispute over profit sharing.

Takeover
On 13 June 2022, a consortium of Australia's Kinetic Group (51%) and Spain's Globalvia (49%) launched a takeover bid. The majority of shareholders voted to accept the offer in August 2022.

Operations
The company's operations include:

Bus operations
United Kingdom

Brighton & Hove – bus operations in Brighton and Hove, acquired in November 1993
Metrobus – bus operation in Crawley, acquired in September 1999, London operations transferred to Go-Ahead London in 2014
Southdown Buses - bus operations in East Surrey and Kent, acquired on 1 February 2023
Go-Ahead London
Blue Triangle – bus operations in Barking, acquired by London General on 29 June 2007
Docklands Buses – bus operations in east London, acquired by London General in 2006
London Central – bus operations in London, acquired in October 1994
London General – bus operations in London, acquired in June 1996
Go North East – bus operations in North East England and the founding company of the Go-Ahead Group in 1987
East Yorkshire – bus operations in Yorkshire and the Humber, acquired in June 2018
Go North West – bus operations in Greater Manchester, acquired in February 2019
Go South Coast
Bluestar – bus operations in Eastleigh, Hythe and Southampton, acquired in July 2005
Damory – bus and coach operations in Dorset, acquired in August 2003
Excelsior – coach operations in Bournemouth, acquired in October 2016
More – bus operations in Bournemouth and Poole (previously Wilts & Dorset), acquired in August 2003
Salisbury Reds – bus operation in Salisbury and Wiltshire (previously Wilts & Dorset), acquired in August 2003
Southern Vectis – bus operations on the Isle of Wight, acquired in July 2005
Swindon's Bus Company – bus operations in Swindon (previously Thamesdown Transport), acquired in February 2017 
Tourist Coaches – coach operations in Wiltshire, acquired in August 2003
Unilink – Southampton University bus services for students and public, acquired on 29 September 2008
Go South West
Dartline Coaches - Bus company in Exeter, acquired in October 2022
Plymouth Citybus – bus operations in Plymouth, acquired in November 2009
Go Cornwall Bus – bus operations in Cornwall, acquired in December 2014
Go Devon Bus - Bus operation in North and Mid Devon, started in October 2022
Go East Anglia 
Konectbus – bus operations in Norfolk, acquired in March 2010
Hedingham & Chambers - bus operations in Essex & Suffolk, merged from two former operators in 2012.
Chambers – bus operations in Suffolk, acquired in June 2012
Hedingham – bus operations in Essex, acquired in March 2012
Oxford Bus Group
Oxford Bus Company – bus operations in Oxford, acquired in March 1994
Thames Travel – bus operations in South Oxfordshire, acquired in May 2011
Carousel Buses – bus operations in High Wycombe, acquired in March 2012
Tom Tappin – city sightseeing bus operations in Oxford, acquired in December 2017

Singapore
Go-Ahead Singapore – bus operations in Singapore, commenced operations September 2016

Ireland
Go-Ahead Ireland – tendered out bus services in Dublin

Australia
U-Go Mobility - This business will be a joint venture between Go-Ahead and Australian business UGL Limited.

Current rail franchises
The company operates the following franchise through Govia, its joint venture with Keolis:
Govia Thameslink Railway – operating under the Southern, Gatwick Express, Thameslink and Great Northern brands

The company also operates railway lines internationally:
Go-Ahead Norge – operating the Oslo South package on the Arendal, Jæren and Sørlandet Lines.
Go-Ahead Germany – operating rail services in Baden-Württemberg and Bavaria

Previous rail franchises
Thames Trains – October 1996 to March 2004
Thameslink – March 1997 to March 2006 (through the Govia joint venture with Keolis)
London Midland – November 2007 to December 2017 (Govia)
Southeastern – April 2006 to October 2021 (Govia). Govia was stripped of the franchise after a serious financial breach of the agreement.

References

External links

Bus groups in the United Kingdom
Companies based in Newcastle upon Tyne
Companies formerly listed on the London Stock Exchange
Go-Ahead Group companies
Kinetic Group companies
Transport companies established in 1987
Transport operators of the United Kingdom
1987 establishments in England
1994 initial public offerings